Rokeya Sakhawat Hossain (9 December 1880 – 9 December 1932), commonly known as Begum Rokeya, was a prominent Bengali  feminist thinker, writer, educator, professor, teacher, writer and women empowerment and political activist for Muslim girls from East Bengal, undivided Bengal in present-day Bangladesh.

She is widely regarded as a pioneer of women's liberation in South Asia. Rokeya is considered as the pioneer feminist of Bengal .

She advocated for men and women to be treated equally as rational beings, noting that the lack of education for women was responsible for their inferior economic position. Her major works include Matichur (A String of Sweet Pearls, 1904 and 1922), a collection of essays in two volumes expressing her feminist thoughts; Sultana's Dream (1908), a feminist science fiction novella set in Ladyland ruled by women; Padmarag ("Essence of the Lotus", 1924) depicting the difficulties faced by Bengali wives; and Abarodhbasini (The Confined Women, 1931), a spirited attack on the extreme forms of purdah that endangered women's lives and self-image.

Rokeya held education to be the central precondition of women's liberation, establishing the first school aimed primarily at Muslim girls in Kolkata. She is said to have gone from house to house persuading the parents to send their girls to her school in Nisha. Until her death, she ran the school despite facing hostile criticism and social obstacles.

In 1916, she founded the Muslim Women's Association, an organization that fought for women's education and employment.  In 1926, Rokeya presided over the Bengal Women's Education Conference convened in Kolkata, the first significant attempt to bring women together in support of women's education rights. She was engaged in debates and conferences regarding the advancement of women until her death on 9 December 1932, shortly after presiding over a session during the Indian Women's Conference.

Bangladesh observes Rokeya Day on 9 December every year to commemorate her works and legacy. On that day, Bangladesh government also confers Begum Rokeya Padak on individual women for their exceptional achievement. In 2004, Rokeya was ranked number 6 in BBC's poll of the Greatest Bengali of all time.

Background and family 

Rokeya was born in 1880, to a Bengali Muslim family in the village of Pairaband, Rangpur, Bengal Presidency, (erstwhile undivided Bengal) . Her ancestors served in the military and judiciary during the Mughal regime. Her father, Zahiruddin Muhammad Abu Ali Haidar Saber, was a zamindar and a multi-lingual intellectual. He married four times; his marriage to Rahatunnessa Sabera Chaudhurani resulted in the birth of Rokeya, who had two sisters and three brothers, one of whom died in childhood. Rokeya's eldest brother Ibrahim Saber, and her immediate elder sister Karimunnesa Khanam Chaudhurani, both had a major influence on her life. Karimunnesa wanted to study Bengali, the language of the majority in Bengali people, against her family's wish who preferred to use Arabic and Persian as the media of education and communication. Ibrahim taught English and Bengali to Rokeya and Karimunnesa. Karimunnesa married at the age of fourteen and later became a poet. Both of her sons, Abdul Karim Ghaznavi and Abdul Halim Ghaznavi, became politicians and occupied ministerial portfolios under British authorities.

Marriage

Rokeya married at the age of 18, in 1898 to 38-year-old Khan Bahadur Sakhawat Hossain. He was an Urdu-speaking deputy magistrate of Bhagalpur (a present-day district of Bihar state). He earned his bachelor of agriculture degree from England and was a member of Royal Agricultural Society of England. He married Rokeya after the death of his first wife. As a liberal, he encouraged Rokeya to continue learning Bengali and English. He also encouraged her to write, and on his advice, she adopted Bengali as the principal language for her literary works.

Literary career

Rokeya launched her literary career in 1902 with a Bengali essay entitled Pipasa (Thirst). She later published the books Matichur (1905) and Sultana's Dream (1908) before her husband died in 1909. In Sultana's Dream, Rokeya wrote reversing the roles of men and women in which women were the dominant sex and the men were subordinate and confined to the mandana (the male equivalent of the zenana). She also depicts an alternative, feminist vision of  science, in which inventions such as solar ovens, flying cars, and cloud condensers are used to benefit the whole of society.
It is regarded as a notable and influential satire. She wrote regularly for the Saogat, Mahammadi, Nabaprabha, Mahila, Bharatmahila, Al-Eslam, Nawroz, Mahe Nao, Bangiya Musalman Sahitya Patrika, The Mussalman, Indian Ladies Magazine and others.

Five months after Rokeya's husband's death, she established a high school, naming it Sakhawat Memorial Girls' High School. It started in Bhagalpur, a traditionally Urdu-speaking area, with five students. A dispute with her husband's family over property forced her to move the school in 1911 to Calcutta, a Bengali-speaking area. She ran the school for 24 years.

Rokeya founded the Anjuman-e-Khawateen-e-Islam (Islamic Women's Association), which was active in holding debates and conferences regarding the status of women and education. She advocated reform, particularly for women, and believed that parochialism and excessive conservatism were principally responsible for the relatively slow development of Muslims in British India. Anjuman-e-Khawateen-e-Islam organised events for social reforms based on the original teachings of Islam that, according to her, were lost.

Literary style 
Rokeya wrote in a number of genres: short stories, poems, essays, novels and satirical writings.  She developed a distinctive literary style, characterised by creativity, logic and a wry sense of humour. She started writing in the Nabanoor from about 1903, under the name of Mrs R S Hossain. However, there is an opinion that her first published writing Pipasa appeared in the Nabaprabha in 1902. Her writings called upon women to protest against injustices and break the social barriers that discriminated against them.

Novels written by Begum Rokeya 

 Pipasha ("Thirst") (1902)
 Matichur 1st Vol. (Essays) (1904)
 Matichur 2nd Vol. (Essays) (1922)
The second volume includes stories and fairy tales:
 Saurajagat (The Solar System),
 Delicia Hatya (translation of the Murder of Delicia - Marie Corelli)
 Jnan-phal (The Fruit of Knowledge)
 Nari-Srishti (Creation of Women)
 Nurse Nelly
 Mukti-phal (The Fruit of Emancipation)
 Sultana's Dream (1905)
 Padmarag ("Essence of the Lotus") (novel) (1924)
 Abarodhbasini ("The Secluded Women") (1931)
 Boligarto (short story)
 Narir Adhikar ("The Rights of Women"), an unfinished essay for the Islamic Women's Association
 God Gives, Man Robs (1927)
 Education Ideals for the Modern Indian Girl (1931)

Death and legacy 

Rokeya died of heart problems on 10 December 1932, on her 52nd birthday.

9 December is celebrated as the Rokeya Day in Bangladesh. On 9 December 2017, Google celebrated her 137th birthday, honoring her with a Google Doodle.

Rokeya's grave in Sodepur was rediscovered due to the efforts of the historian Amalendu De. It is located inside the campus of Panihati Girls' High School, Panihati, Sodepur.

Rokeya is considered as the pioneer feminist of Bengal. Universities, public buildings and a National Award has been named after her in Bangladesh. She was an inspiration for many later generation female authors including Sufia Kamal, Tahmima Anam, and others.

Eponyms
Begum Rokeya Day,  a commemoration of the birth and death anniversary of Rokeya, observed annually on 9 December in Bangladesh.
Begum Rokeya Padak, a Bangladeshi national honour conferred on individual women for their exceptional achievements.
Begum Rokeya Memorial Center,  an academic and cultural hub in Pairaband, Bangladesh.
Rokeya Shoroni, a road in Dhaka.
Begum Rokeya University, a public state university in Bangladesh.
Rokeya Hall, the largest female residential hall of the University of Dhaka. Even Khulna University of Engineering and Technology, Bangladesh Agricultural University, Rajshahi University also has a female residential hall named after Begum Rokeya.
Sakhawat Memorial Govt. Girls' High School, kolkata, West Bengal.
Begum Rokeya Smriti Balika Vidalaya in Saltlake, West Bengal.

Notes

References

External links
 
 Rokeya Sakhawat Hossain at the Encyclopedia of Science Fiction
 
 
 

1880 births
1932 deaths
19th-century Indian writers
19th-century Indian women writers
20th-century Indian writers
20th-century Indian women writers
Bengali Muslims
Bengali writers
Bengali-language writers
Indian feminist writers
Indian feminists
Indian women's rights activists
Proponents of Islamic feminism
People from Rangpur District
Women science fiction and fantasy writers
19th-century Bengalis
20th-century Bengalis
Begum Rokeya